Jailbreak in Hamburg is a 1971 German thriller film directed by Wolfgang Staudte and starring Horst Frank, Christiane Krüger, and Heinz Reincke.

The film's sets were designed by the art director Peter Rothe. It was shot on location around Hamburg including on the Reeperbahn.

Synopsis
A dangerous prisoner escapes in a jailbreak and goes on the loose in Hamburg where he seeks assistance from his family.

Cast

References

External links

1971 films
1970s thriller films
German thriller films
West German films
1970s German-language films
Films directed by Wolfgang Staudte
Films set in Hamburg
Films shot in Hamburg
Films about brothers
Constantin Film films
1970s German films